Øyvind Mellemstrand (born 17 October 1969), is a Norwegian retired footballer who played as a defender.

Club career
Mellemstrand played for Viking during the early 1990s, and played against Barcelona in the 1992–93 UEFA Champions League, where the Norwegian side narrowly lost 1–0 on aggregate in the first round against the defending European Champions.

References

External links

1969 births
Living people
Association football defenders
Viking FK players
FK Haugesund players
Norwegian footballers
Eliteserien players
People from Stord
Sportspeople from Vestland